Armée Patriotique Rwandaise Basketball Club, commonly known simply as APR, is a Rwandan basketball club based in Kigali. Owned and funded by the Ministry of Defence of Rwanda, the team plays in the Rwanda Basketball League (RBL). It has won seven national championships.

In 2008, APR became the first team in league history to finish the regular season unbeaten.

Honours

National Basketball League
Champions (7): 2008, 2009, 2011 (4 seasons unknown)
Runners-up (2): 2013, 2014
Rwandan Heroes Cup
Runners-up (1): 2020
FIBA Africa Clubs Champions Cup
Third place: 2009

History:

League positions:
18-3, 19-4, 20-2(Gr.B), 21-1(Gr.B), 22-2

League achievements:

Rwandan League Semifinals -2018, 19, 20, 21, 22

Rwandan Heroes Cup Finalist -2020

Rwandan League Group B Regular Season Runner-Up -2020

Rwandan League Group B Regular Season Champion -2021

Rwandan League Regular Season Runner-Up -2022

African cups:

2007: Africa Club Championship: took 3rd place (4-1) in Group A of Preliminary Round, lost to Abidjan BC 37-81 in the Quarterfinals, lost to Niger Potters 74-93 in the 5th Place Game

2008: Africa Club Championship: took 2nd place (4-1) in Group A of Preliminary Round, lost to 1º de Agosto 50-87 in the Quarterfinals, lost to Union Bank 64-65 in the 7th Place Game

2009: Africa Club Championship: took 2nd place (2-1) in Group A of Preliminary Round, lost to Primeiro de Agosto 84-98, beat ASB Mazembe 92-80 in the 3rd Place Game (!!!)

In African competitions
FIBA Africa Clubs Champions Cup  (3 appearances)
2007 – 6th Place
2008 – 8th Place
2009 –  Third place

Season by season

Players

Current roster

Notable players 

  Wilson Nshobozwabyosenumukiza
  Elie Kaje
  Cedric Isom
   Ntore Habimana
   Kami Kabange
  Darko Balaban
  Tom Wamukota

Women's team 
APR BBC's women's team plays in the Rwandan Women's League and have represented the country in the 2022 FIBA Africa Women's Champions Cup.

References

External links
APR Basketball Club at Eurobasket.com
APR BBC power into play-offs Newtimes

Basketball teams in Rwanda
Basketball teams established in 1993
1993 establishments in Rwanda